Amaryllis migo is a species of crustacean in the family Amaryllididae, and was first described in 2002 by James K. Lowry and Helen E. Stoddart.

It is a marine sublittoral species found in South Australia and Western Australia, in the IMCRA regions of the Southwest Shelf Province, the Great Australian Bight Shelf Transition, and the Spencer Gulf Shelf Province at depths of 5-21 m and usually amongst algae.

References

External links
 Amaryllis migo occurrence data from GBIF

Crustaceans described in 2002
Taxa named by James K. Lowry
Amphipoda